Kazem Darabi (born 1964) is an Iranian intelligence service employee who was sentenced to life imprisonment by the Berlin Supreme Court for murdering four Kurdish dissidents in Berlin in 1992. According to the court proceedings, Darabi was the one who organized the Mykonos restaurant assassinations. On December 10, 2007, Darabi was released early after 15 years in prison and then deported to Iran. Kazem Darabi was greeted by senior Foreign Ministry officials upon his return to Iran.

References

People imprisoned on charges of terrorism
Iranian assassins
Terrorist incidents in Germany
1964 births
Living people